This is a list of events in Scottish television from 1966.

Events

31 March - Television coverage of the 1966 general election.
Unknown - Scottish Television is listed on the London Stock Exchange.

Television series
Scotsport (1957–2008)
The White Heather Club (1958–1968)
Dr. Finlay's Casebook (1962–1971)
The Adventures of Francie and Josie (1962–1970)

Births

13 January - Gavin Mitchell, actor
28 June - Sara Stewart, actress
15 October - Dougie Vipond, musician and actor
Unknown - Colin Buchanan, actor

See also
1966 in Scotland

References

 
Television in Scotland by year
1960s in Scottish television